Fritz Sarasin, full name Karl Friedrich Sarasin (3 December 1859 – 23 March 1942) was a Swiss naturalist.

He was a second cousin of Paul Sarasin. They made a scientific expedition to Celebes (now Sulawesi).

Taxon named in his honor 
Paul and Fritz Sarasin are commemorated in the scientific names of five species of reptiles:
 Amphiesma sarasinorum, 
Correlophus sarasinorum, 
Nessia sarasinorum, 
Pseudorabdion sarasinorum, and 
Sphenomorphus sarasinorum.
And fish:
Sarasin's goby Mugilogobius sarasinorum is named in the cousins honor.
There are seven species, two genera and one subfamily of harvestmen named after them.

Bibliography

He has published some of scientific works together with Paul Sarasin.
 Sarasin F. & Roux J. (eds.) (1913–1918). "Nova Caledonia. Forschungen in Neu-Caledonien und auf den Loyalty-Inseln. Recherches scientifiques en Nouvelle-Calédonie et aux iles Loyalty". Wiesbaden.
 (1913). A. Zoologie. Volume I.
 (1915). A. Zoologie. Volume II.
 (1923). A. Zoologie. Volume III.
 (1925). A. Zoologie. Volume IV.
 Aus einem glücklichen Leben. Biographische Notizen, Frobenius AG, Basel 1941.

References

External links
 

Swiss naturalists
1859 births
1942 deaths